The Bakić were a Serbian noble family that initially held estates in Šumadija (south of the Danube) under Ottoman occupation, then crossed the river and gave its service to the Kingdom of Hungary, becoming one of the leading Serbian noble family in the country, fighting the Ottoman Empire.

Pavle Bakić had a timar, as did his father, and held great estates around Venčac in Šumadija called "Bakić's land". He was highly viewed of by the Ottoman Empire, and had the rights to collect taxes (kharaj) from his people. In talks with Pál Tomori and Louis II of Hungary, he left his land with his family, five brothers (including Petar Bakić), and a great number of Serbs, into Hungary, and in return he received the town of Lak among other estates. With his forces he participated in the Battle of Mohács in 1526.  When the succession war between Ferdinand I and John Zápolya started, he took the side of Zápolya. After the defeat of Zápolya in the Battle of Tokaj in 1527, he sided with Ferdinand and would stay faithful to him for the rest of his life. In 1528, Ferdinand confirmed Bakić and his brothers' holdings and appointed him the captain of the Serbian infantry, cavalry and river forces. In the defence of Vienna in 1529, Bakić was an important aspect with his cavalry. In charters of 1534, Ferdinand again confirmed Bakić and his brothers' holdings (Lak, Győr, Szombathely, Hédervár and all estates that were part of these towns). The fortress of Győr was administered by his Hungarian ally Count György Cseszneky. A charter dated September 20, 1537, titles him as Despot and called all Serbs to join Bakić as the Serbian Despot.  Attempts made by King Ferdinand to push the Ottomans out of Slavonia, with the use of Pavle, were not successful. Bakić did not manage to liberate Osijek from the Ottomans, he then retreated to Đakovo, where he died in 1537 at the battle of Gorjani, against the Ottomans. Mehmed Pasha sent his son with the head of Bakić to Istanbul.

Members
Pavle Bakić (Pál, fl. 1526-1537)
Margit, married Menyhért Balassa)
Angelika, married Imre Révay, later Imre Czobor.
Petar Bakić (Péter, fl. 1542-1552)
 (Kelemen, fl.)
 (Manó, fl.)
 (Demeter, fl.)
 (Mihály, fl.)
 (Bakics Mátyás, fl. 1565)
 (Bakics Péter, fl. 1715-1723)
 (Bakics Antal, fl. 1727)

References

Sources

 
 
 
 
 
 
 
 

16th-century Serbian nobility
17th-century Serbian nobility
18th-century Serbian nobility
Hungarian nobility
Serbian noble families
Serbian Despotate
Families of the Habsburg monarchy